CU Spaceflight is a student-run society at Cambridge University. It is founded with the aim of achieving access to space, with minimal financial expenses. The society is supported by the Cambridge-MIT Institute.

History
The society was founded in the summer of 2006, with the specific goal of launching a rocket into space for less than GBP£1000.

As of November, 2007, CU Spaceflight has launched five non-crewed high-altitude balloons, of which two were not successful: Nova 2 was blown into the North Sea and Nova 5 failed to ignite the Martlet 1 solid rocket motor, but landed in a reusable state.

CU Spaceflight is a participant of the UK High Altitude Society.

Owlstone Photography Prize

On 27 June 2007, CU Spaceflight won the Owlstone Photography Prize, having submitted an unenhanced photograph from the Nova 1 flight, displaying the curvature of the Earth as seen from Near space. The entry was entitled "Earth from 32km". CU Spaceflight won a cash prize and 25-hours of workshop time.

Projects
, Cambridge University Spaceflight has three projects which it is pursuing; all three are critical to the long-term goal of successfully launching a rocket into space and retrieving it.

Nova
Nova is CU Spaceflight's first project and has the objective of launching high-altitude balloons on test flights to near space. The lifting gas used is helium.

Meteor
Meteor is a project designed to provide a landing system for falling body to a 100-metre accuracy, from any point within the Earth's atmosphere.
The Meteor project will use a paraglider to land objects.

Martlet
Martlet is the project aimed at the development of a small rocket and launch system which can be launched from a Nova balloon in the upper atmosphere.

CU Spaceflight aim the final Martlet rocket to be less than 1 metre long, weigh 3.5 kilograms, and carry a 0.5 kg payload. The intended cost per launch is less than GBP£1000. The rocket will be a solid-fuel rocket. Its objective is to reach suborbital space - i.e. reaching altitudes in excess of 100 km (the boundary of space).

The idea of a balloon-launched rocket - a rockoon - is not new, but is rarely practiced. The incentives for air-based launch are that the altitude the balloons reach are in the near space region - which is above 99% of the atmosphere - thus resulting in significantly less atmospheric drag, requiring far less rocket fuel.

Press coverage
Since its inception, Cambridge University Spaceflight has been covered by several major news sources, including The Guardian and BBC News.

Photos from the Nova 9 launch were printed in many national newspapers including The Times, The Daily Telegraph and The Daily Mail. Members of the team also gave interviews to the Discovery Channel, Sky News and the BBC World Service.

Recognition
Following the success of Nova 1 and the announcement of the Martlet and Meteor projects, CU Spaceflight has received interest from the university's Department for Atmospheric Chemistry and the British Antarctic Survey on the results of its work.

Outreach
CU Spaceflight has performed talks in secondary schools in and around Cambridge, UK, and continues to offer to do so, hoping to raise the profile of engineering and aerospace in particular.

During the 2007 Cambridge Science Festival, CU Spaceflight launched their Nova 5 balloon in front of a large crowd.

See also
 High-altitude balloon
 Amateur rocketry
 Spaceflight

References

External links
 CU Spaceflight official Forum
 CU Spaceflight official website
 MIT Rocket Team
 UK High Altitude Society
 Camera Captures Dramatic Curvature of the Earth, During a Test Flight by Cambridge University

Spaceflight
Spaceflight
Rocketry
Ballooning
Organizations established in 2006
2006 establishments in England